Dottley is a surname. Notable people with the surname include:

Jason Dottley (born 1980), American actor, singer, writer, director, and producer
John "Kayo" Dottley (born 1928), American football player